Jason Davies is a Welsh international lawn and indoor bowler.

He won a silver medal in the fours at the 1996 World Outdoor Bowls Championship in Adelaide.

References

Welsh male bowls players
Living people
Year of birth missing (living people)